Piotr Bochenek (born 15 July 1975) is a Polish rower. He competed in the men's coxless pair event at the 2000 Summer Olympics.

References

External links
 

1975 births
Living people
Polish male rowers
Olympic rowers of Poland
Rowers at the 2000 Summer Olympics
Rowers from Warsaw